Nugroho is an Indonesian surname. Notable people with the surname include:

Adi Nugroho, Indonesian footballer
Anggun Nugroho (born 1982), Indonesian badminton player
Garin Nugroho (born 1961), Indonesian film director
Bayu Nugroho (born 1999), Indonesian footballer

Indonesian-language surnames